Moutiers and Les Moutiers may refer to the following places in France :

Moutiers, Eure-et-Loir, in the Eure-et-Loir department
Moutiers, Ille-et-Vilaine, in the Ille-et-Vilaine department
Moutiers, Meurthe-et-Moselle, in the Meurthe-et-Moselle department
Moûtiers, in the Savoie department
Moutiers-au-Perche, in the Orne department
Moutiers-en-Puisaye, in the Yonne department
Moutiers-les-Mauxfaits, in the Vendée department
Moutiers-Saint-Jean, in the Côte-d'Or department
Moutiers-sous-Argenton, in the Deux-Sèvres department
Moutiers-sous-Chantemerle, in the Deux-Sèvres department
Moutiers-sur-le-Lay, in the Vendée department
Moutier-d'Ahun, in the Creuse department 
Moutier-Malcard, in the Creuse department 
Moutier-Rozeille, in the Creuse department
Les Moutiers-en-Auge, in the Calvados department
Les Moutiers-en-Cinglais, in the Calvados department
Les Moutiers-en-Retz, in the Loire-Atlantique department
Les Moutiers-Hubert, in the Calvados department

See also
 Esves-le-Moutier, in the Indre-et-Loire department
 Fain-lès-Moutiers, in the Côte-d'Or department
 Jouy-le-Moutier, in the Val-d'Oise department
 Juigné-des-Moutiers, in the Loire-Atlantique department
 Les Trois-Moutiers, in the Vienne department
 Marville-Moutiers-Brûlé, in the Eure-et-Loir department
 Saint-Pierre-le-Moûtier, in the Nièvre department
 Thin-le-Moutier, in the Ardennes department
 Vieil-Moutier, in the Pas-de-Calais department 
 Villy-le-Moutier, in the Côte-d'Or department